To Stay Alive: A Method is a 2016 Dutch documentary film directed by Erik Lieshout, Arno Hagers and Reinier van Brummelen. It is based on Michel Houellebecq's 1991 essay "To Stay Alive", about struggling artists, the role of the poet, and mental health problems. It features marginal artists as well as Houellebecq and the rock singer Iggy Pop, who reads from the original essay.

Production
The director Erik Lieshout had first met Houellebecq when he interviewed him for Dutch television during the promotion of the novel The Possibility of an Island, and ended up directing Last Words, a behind-the-scenes documentary for Houellebecq's own film adaptation of the novel. Lieshout then asked Iggy Pop if he could possibly provide a track for the film, with little hope; but to his surprise, the singer replied very enthusiastically: in the meantime he had actually read the book (as well as a selection of Houellebecq's poetry), and loved it, finding many parallels with his own life and state of mind, to the point that it inspired him a whole album, named Préliminaires, quieter than his usual output, partly sung in French, with several tracks directly related to the novel. The two artists first met in 2009, during the promotion for the album, and shared their admiration for each other's works. Indeed, Houellebecq has been a devoted fan of The Stooges since he was a teenager, contrasting with his reputation for apathy and languid intellectualism.

To Stay Alive: A Method was produced by Serious Film with co-production support from AT-prod and VPRO. It was completed in April 2016.

Release
The film was screened at the International Documentary Film Festival Amsterdam on 19 November 2016. It was released in Dutch cinemas on 2 February 2017.

References

External links
 Official website
 
 The essay "To Stay Alive" in English translation at Houellebecq.info

2016 films
Documentary films about the arts
Dutch documentary films
Films based on literature
Films based on works by Michel Houellebecq
2010s French-language films
2016 documentary films
2016 multilingual films
Dutch multilingual films
2010s English-language films